

M 

 1353 Maartje
 
 
 
 510 Mabella
 
 
 
 
 
 
 
 
 
 
 
 
 
 
 
 
 
 
 
 
 
 
 
 
 
 
 
 
 
 
 
 
 
 
 
 
 
 
 
 
 
 
 
 
 
 
 
 
 74503 Madola
 
 
 
 
 
 
 
 
 
 
 
 
 
 
 
 
 318 Magdalena
 
 
 4055 Magellan
 
 
 2696 Magion
 8992 Magnanimity
 
 2094 Magnitka
 
 1060 Magnolia
 
 1459 Magnya
 1355 Magoeba
 
 
 
 
 
 
 
 
 
 
 
 
 
 
 
 
 
 
 
 
 
 
 
 
 
 
 
 66 Maja
 
 
 
 
 
 
 
 
 
 
 
 
 
 
 
 
 
 136472 Makemake
 3063 Makhaon
 2139 Makharadze
 
 
 
 
 4904 Makio
 
 
 
 
 
 
 1771 Makover
 
 
 754 Malabar
 
 
 
 
 
 
 
 
 
 
 
 7387 Malbil
 
 
 
 
 
 
 
 10415 Mali Lošinj
 
 
 
 
 
 
 
 
 
 
 
 
 1179 Mally
 
 1527 Malmquista
 
 
 
 
 
 
 
 1072 Malva
 
 
 
 
 
 749 Malzovia
 
 
 
 
 
 
 
 
 
 
 
 
 
 
 
 
 
 
 
 
 
 15460 Manca
 
 758 Mancunia
 
 
 739 Mandeville
 
 
 
 
 
 
 
 
 
 
 
 
 
 
 
 
 
 
 
 
 
 
 
 
 
 
 
 
 
 
 
 
 
 
 
 870 Manto
 
 
 
 
 
 
 
 385446 Manwë
 
 
 
 
 
 
 
 
 
 
 
 
 
 
 
 
 565 Marbachia
 
 
 
 
 
 
 
 
 1300 Marcelle
 
 
 
 
 
 
 
 
 
 
 
 
 
 
 
 
 
 
 
 
 
 
 
 
 
 
 
 
 
 1332 Marconia
 
 
 
 
 
 
 
 
 
 
 
 
 
 2173 Maresjev
 
 
 
 
 
 
 
 
 
 
 310 Margarita
 
 
 735 Marghanna
 
 
 
 1175 Margo
 
 
 1434 Margot
 1410 Margret
 
 170 Maria
 
 
 
 
 
 
 
 
 
 
 
 
 
 
 602 Marianna
 
 
 
 
 
 
 
 
 
 
 
 
 
 
 
 
 
 
 
 1486 Marilyn
 
 
 
 1202 Marina
 
 
 
 
 
 
 
 
 
 
 506 Marion
 
 
 
 
 
 
 
 912 Maritima
 
 
 
 
 
 
 
 
 
 
 
 
 
 
 
 
 
 
 
 
 
 
 
 
 
 
 
 
 
 
 
 
 
 
 
 
 
 
 
 
 
 
 1010 Marlene
 746 Marlu
 1174 Marmara
 711 Marmulla
 
 
 
 
 
 
 
 
 
 
 
 1877 Marsden
 
 
 
 
 
 
 
 
 
 
 
 343158 Marsyas
 
 
 
 
 
 5026 Martes
 205 Martha
 
 
 
 
 
 
 
 981 Martina
 
 
 
 
 
 
 
 
 
 
 
 
 
 
 
 
 
 
 
 1582 Martir
 
 
 
 
 
 
 
 
 
 
 
 
 
 
 
 
 
 
 
 
 
 
 
 
 
 
 
 
 
 
 
 
 
 
 
 
 
 
 
 24827 Maryphil
 
 
 
 
 
 
 
 
 
 
 
 
 
 
 
 
 
 
 
 
 
 
 
 
 
 
 
 
 
 
 1841 Masaryk
 
 
 
 
 
 
 
 
 
 
 
 
 
 
 
 1467 Mashona
 
 21795 Masi
 
 
 
 
 
 
 
 3131 Mason-Dixon
 
 
 4547 Massachusetts
 20 Massalia
 
 
 
 
 1904 Massevitch
 
 
 760 Massinga
 
 
 
 
 
 
 
 
 
 2685 Masursky
 
 
 
 
 
 
 
 
 
 454 Mathesis
 
 
 253 Mathilde
 
 
 
 
 
 
 
 
 1513 Mátra
 
 
 
 
 
 
 
 
 
 
 
 
 
 
 
 
 
 
 
 
 
 
 
 883 Matterania
 
 
 
 
 
 
 
 
 
 
 
 
 
 
 
 
 
 
 
 
 
 7687 Matthias
 
 
 
 765 Mattiaca
 
 
 
 
 
 
 
 
 
 
 
 
 
 
 
 1748 Mauderli
 
 
 
 
 
 
 3281 Maupertuis
 
 
 
 
 
 
 
 
 
 745 Mauritia
 
 
 
 
 1607 Mavis
 
 
 
 
 
 
 1217 Maximiliana
 
 
 
 
 
 
 
 
 
 
 
 
 
 
 348 May
 
 
 
 2131 Mayall
 
 
 
 
 
 
 
 
 
 
 
 
 
 
 1690 Mayrhofer
 
 
 
 
 
 
 
 
 
 
 
 
 
 
 184314 Mbabamwanawaresa
 
 
 
 
 
 
 
 3352 McAuliffe
 
 
 
 
 
 
 
 
 
 
 
 
 
 5641 McCleese
 
 
 
 
 
 
 
 
 
 
 
 
 
 
 2007 McCuskey
 
 
 
 
 991 McDonalda
 
 
 
 1853 McElroy
 
 3066 McFadden
 
 
 
 
 
 
 
 
 
 
 
 4432 McGraw-Hill
 
 
 
 
 
 
 
 
 
 
 2024 McLaughlin
 
 
 
 1955 McMath
 
 
 
 
 
 
 
 
 
 
 
 
 
 
 
 
 
 
 
 873 Mechthild
 
 5025 Mecisteus
 
 
 
 212 Medea
 
 
 4715 Medesicaste
 
 
 
 
 
 
 
 4836 Medon
 
 149 Medusa
 
 
 
 
 
 2213 Meeus
 
 464 Megaira
 
 
 
 
 
 
 4833 Meges
 
 
 
 
 
 
 
 
 
 
 
 
 
 
 
 
 
 
 
 
 
 4065 Meinel
 
 
 
 
 
 
 
 
 
 
 
 
 688 Melanie
 
 
 
 
 
 56 Melete
 137 Meliboea
 
 
 
 
 
 
 
 
 
 
 676 Melitta
 
 869 Mellena
 
 
 
 18 Melpomene
 373 Melusina
 
 
 
 
 
 2895 Memnon
 1247 Memoria
 
 
 
 
 
 
 
 
 
 
 3868 Mendoza
 1647 Menelaus
 4068 Menestheus
 
 
 
 188 Menippe
 
 
 
 
 
 
 1078 Mentha
 3451 Mentor
 1967 Menzel
 3553 Mera
 536 Merapi
 
 
 
 
 1136 Mercedes
 
 
 
 
 
 
 3596 Meriones
 
 
 2598 Merlin
 
 1051 Merope
 
 
 
 
 
 
 1299 Mertona
 808 Merxia
 
 
 
 
 545 Messalina
 
 
 
 
 
 
 
 
 
 
 1050 Meta
 792 Metcalfia
 
 
 9 Metis
 
 2486 Metsähovi
 1727 Mette
 
 
 
 
 
 
 
 
 
 
 1574 Meyer
 1739 Meyermann
 
 
 
 
 
 
 
 
 
 
 
 
 
 
 
 
 
 
 
 
 
 
 
 
 
 
 
 
 
 
 
 
 
 
 
 
 
 
 
 
 
 
 
 
 
 
 
 
 
 
 
 
 
 
 
 
 
 
 
 
 
 
 
 
 
 
 
 
 
 
 
 
 
 
 1045 Michela
 
 
 
 
 
 
 
 
 
 1376 Michelle
 
 
 
 
 
 
 
 
 
 
 
 
 
 
 
 
 
 
 
 2348 Michkovitch
 
 
 
 
 
 1981 Midas
 
 
 
 
 
 
 9767 Midsomer Norton
 
 1753 Mieke
 
 
 
 
 
 
 
 
 
 
 
 
 
 
 
 
 
 
 
 
 28439 Miguelreyes
 
 
 
 
 
 
 
 
 
 
 51824 Mikeanderson
 11714 Mikebrown
 
 
 
 
 
 
 
 
 
 
 
 
 
 
 
 
 
 
 
 
 
 
 
 
 
 
 
 
 
 
 
 
 
 
 
 
 
 
 
 1910 Mikhailov
 
 
 
 
 
 
 
 
 
 
 
 
 
 
 
 
 
 
 1605 Milankovitch
 
 
 
 878 Mildred
 
 
 
 
 
 
 216433 Milianleo
 10241 Miličević
 
 
 
 1826 Miller
 
 
 
 
 
 
 
 
 
 
 
 
 
 4332 Milton
 
 
 
 
 1127 Mimi
 
 
 
 1079 Mimosa
 
 
 
 
 
 
 
 
 
 
 
 
 93 Minerva
 
 
 
 
 
 
 
 
 
 
 
 
 
 
 
 
 6239 Minos
 
 
 
 
 
 
 
 
 
 
 
 
 
 594 Mireille
 
 
 
 102 Miriam
 
 
 
 
 
 
 
 
 
 
 
 
 
 
 
 
 569 Misa
 
 
 
 
 4828 Misenus
 
 
 
 
 
 
 
 
 
 
 
 
 26858 Misterrogers
 
 
 
 
 
 
 1088 Mitaka
 
 
 
 
 
 
 1455 Mitchella
 
 
 
 4486 Mithra
 
 
 
 
 
 
 
 
 
 
 
 
 
 
 
 
 
 
 
 
 
 
 
 
 
 
 
 
 
 
 
 
 
 
 
 
 
 
 
 
 
 
 
 
 
 
 
 
 
 2090 Mizuho
 
 
 
 
 
 
 
 
 
 
 
 
 
 57 Mnemosyne
 9023 Mnesthus
 
 
 
 
 
 
 
 
 733 Mocia
 
 
 
 
 370 Modestia
 
 11118 Modra
 
 
 
 
 
 5542 Moffatt
 
 
 
 766 Moguntia
 
 
 
 
 
 
 
 638 Moira
 
 
 
 
 
 
 
 
 
 
 
 
 
 
 
 
 
 
 
 
 
 
 
 1428 Mombasa
 
 
 
 
 
 428 Monachia
 
 
 
 
 
 
 
 
 
 
 
 
 833 Monica
 
 
 
 
 
 
 
 
 
 
 
 
 
 
 535 Montague
 
 
 797 Montana
 
 
 
 
 
 782 Montefiore
 
 
 
 947 Monterosa
 
 
 
 
 
 
 
 
 
 
 
 
 
 
 
 
 
 
 
 
 
 
 
 
 
 1257 Móra
 
 
 
 
 
 
 
 
 
 
 
 
 
 
 
 
 
 
 
 
 
 
 
 
 
 
 
 
 
 
 
 
 
 
 
 14436 Morishita
 
 
 
 
 
 
 
 
 
 
 
 4197 Morpheus
 
 
 152188 Morricone
 
 
 
 
 341520 Mors-Somnus
 
 
 
 
 
 
 
 
 
 
 
 66391 Moshup
 
 
 
 787 Moskva
 
 
 
 
 
 
 
 
 
 
 
 
 
 
 
 
 
 
 
 993 Moultona
 
 
 
 
 2590 Mourão
 
 
 
 
 
 
 
 
 
 
 1034 Mozartia
 
 
 
 
 
 
 
 
 1832 Mrkos
 
 
 
 
 
 
 
 
 
 
 
 4031 Mueller
 
 
 
 
 
 
 
 
 
 
 
 
 
 
 
 10251 Mulisch
 5476 Mulius
 
 
 
 
 
 
 
 
 
 
 
 1466 Mündleria
 
 
 
 
 
 
 1608 Muñoz
 4942 Munroe
 
 
 
 
 
 
 
 
 
 
 
 
 
 
 
 
 
 
 
 
 
 
 
 
 
 
 
 941 Murray
 600 Musa
 
 
 
 
 
 966 Muschi
 
 
 
 1059 Mussorgskia
 
 
 
 
 
 
 
 
 
 
 
 
 
 
 
 
 
 
 
 
 
 
 
 
 
 
 
 7835 Myroncope
 381 Myrrha

See also 
 List of minor planet discoverers
 List of observatory codes

References 
 

Lists of minor planets by name